Berthe Ostyn was a German film actress active in the 1930s.

Selected filmography
 The Night Belongs to Us (1929)
 The Blonde Nightingale (1930)
 The Great Longing (1930)
 The Son of the White Mountain (1930)
 Duty is Duty (1931)
 Headfirst into Happiness (1931)
 The Paw (1931)
 Everyone Asks for Erika (1931)
 I Go Out and You Stay Here (1931)
 Transit Camp (1932)
 Kiki (1932)
 The Champion Shot (1932)
 A City Upside Down (1933)

References

Bibliography
 Goble, Alan. The Complete Index to Literary Sources in Film. Walter de Gruyter, 1999.

External links

1906 births
Year of death unknown
German film actresses
People from Aachen